The NA48 experiment was a series of particle physics experiments in the field of kaon physics being carried out at the North Area of the Super Proton Synchrotron at CERN. The collaboration involved over 100 physicists mostly from Western Europe and Russia.

The construction of the NA48 experimental setup took place early 1990s. The primary physics goal – the search for direct CP violation – was inherited from the predecessor NA31 experiment. The physics data taking runs took place between 1997 and 2001. The discovery of the phenomenon of direct CP violation, one of the most important experimental results obtained at CERN, was announced by the collaboration in 1999. The publication of the final result was made in 2001. In addition the experiment made a contribution to studies of rare decays of neutral kaons.

The following stage of the experiment (NA48/1) was carried out in 2002 and was devoted to high precision study of rare decays of neutral kaons and hyperons. The next stage (NA48/2) was carried out in 2003–2004 and was dedicated to a large programme of studies of properties of charged kaons, including the search of direct CP violation, studies of rare decays of the charged kaon, and low-energy QCD using final state rescattering.

The successor of NA48 is the NA62 experiment, which started data collection in 2015 and is dedicated to further studies of rare decays of the charged kaon.

See also
 NA31 experiment
 NA62 experiment

External links
NA48 website
NA48/1 website
NA48/2 website
NA62 website
The experiments NA48 and NA62 at CERN
CERN-NA-048 experiment record on INSPIRE-HEP

CERN experiments
Particle experiments